Sons of Zion is a six-member New Zealand reggae band who formed in 2007 in Pakuranga, Auckland. They became widely famous in New Zealand in early 2018, due to the popularity of their single "Drift Away".

Biography

Band members Sam Eriwata and Joel Latimer grew up together in Auckland. They formed a youth band together when they attended Edgewater College in Pakuranga. The trio met Rio Panapa, originally from Rotorua, through joint church services where bands from different chapters of their church performed. Eventually Panapa moved to Auckland and joined Samuel Eriwata's youth band.

The original line-up featured Rio Panapa as lead vocalist and guitarist, Samuel Eriwata on drums, Joel Latimer on keyboards and Dylan Stewart, a bassist who moved from Whangarei to Auckland to join the band. The band won a competition to be the opening act at the Soundsplash Festival 2007 in Raglan, and hurriedly recorded an extended play so that they could release it at the festival. Panapa had difficulties with the range of some of the songs during these sessions, so Eriwata also became a vocalist for the band. The band later added Tawhiri Littlejohn as a permanent drummer as Eriwata took over more of the vocal duties, and Harlem McKenzie as a lead guitarist.

In October 2009, the band released their self-titled debut album, and spent the next few years extensively touring New Zealand and Australia. The band's singles "Good Love" (2012) and "Tell Her" (2013) received major radio airplay in New Zealand, becoming their first songs to chart in New Zealand. Their second album Universal Love was a major hit, reaching number three in New Zealand. At the 2014 Waiata Māori Music Awards, the video for the band's collaboration with Tomorrow People won the best video award. Later that year, the band covered "Sensitive to a Smile" alongside other local reggae musicians such as Katchafire and Tomorrow People as a charity single to combat child abuse.

The band's 2015 single "Stuck on Stupid" became popular internationally online, especially in locations such as Hawaii where it was a local radio hit. By 2015, the band's line-up had solidified as Eriwata, Panapa, Latimer, bassist Matt Sadgrove, Caleb Haapu of the band L40, and Ross Nansen of the Levites. In the next few years, the band's popularity online was cemented by the includion of their songs such as "I'm Ready", "Fill Me Up" and "Now" featuring on major Australasian reggae Spotify playlists. In 2017, the band produced the Te Reo song "Wairua" by Maimoa, which became a viral hit.

By 2017, the band began to experiment with genres outside of reggae, such as their collaboration "Is That Enough" with Aaradhna. For the band's third album Vantage Point (2018), all members decided to quit their day-jobs to focus entirely on the band. The first single from the album, "Drift Away", became a break-away hit for the group. The album was a success, becoming Platinum certified in New Zealand. The band toured internationally to promote the album.

In 2020, Panapa became the host of the Māori Television show Lifted.

Artistry

Sons of Zion write, produce and mix all of their music. In 2017, the band created their own recording studio, No Filter Studios in Auckland.

Personal lives

Samuel Eriwata's father is Richard Eriwata, a musician who became famous in the 1980s as a member of the musical theatre television show 12 Bar Rhythm 'n Shoes. Caleb Haapu's brother is singer-songwriter Seth Haapu.

Eriwata, Latimer, Stewart and Littlejohn are of Ngāpuhi descent, while Panapa's background includes Te Arawa, Ngāti Tūwharetoa and Waikato Tainui.

Discography

Studio albums

Compilation albums

Extended plays

Singles

As lead artist

As featured artist

Other charted songs

Notes

References

External links
 

2007 establishments in New Zealand
New Zealand reggae musical groups
Musical groups established in 2007
Musical groups from Auckland
Sony Music New Zealand artists
Ngāpuhi
New Zealand Māori musical groups
Pacific reggae
Māori-language singers